Bartholomew Frere (30 November 1776 – 29 May 1851) was an English diplomat.

Life
Frere was born in 1776, the fifth son of John Frere, F.R.S., M.P. for Norwich, and a younger brother of John Hookham Frere and William Frere. He proceeded B.A. at Trinity College, Cambridge, in 1799, and M.A. in 1806. In 1801 he was appointed secretary of legation at Lisbon, whence he was transferred in the same capacity to Madrid in 1802 and Berlin 1805, and in 1807 became secretary of embassy at Constantinople, and witnessed the discomfiture of Charles Arbuthnot and Admiral Duckworth. In 1808 he returned to Spain as secretary of embassy, and acted as minister plenipotentiary ad interim at Seville from November 1809 to January 1810, and at Cadiz from 29 Jan. to 2 March. Gazetted secretary of embassy at Constantinople in March 1811, he and his chief, Robert Liston, did not proceed to their post till the following year, when in June they relieved Stratford Canning from his responsibility as minister plenipotentiary. From 1815 to 1817, and again from 1820 to 1821, Frere took charge of the embassy at the Porte as minister plenipotentiary ad interim, but in August 1821 he finally retired on a pension, which he enjoyed for thirty years, till his death in Old Burlington Street, London, 29 May 1851, aged 74. His DNB biographer, Stanley Lane-Poole, summed him up as "a useful public servant of ordinary abilities."

References

External links

1776 births
1851 deaths
British diplomats
Alumni of Trinity College, Cambridge
Bartholomew